Saint David is an unincorporated village in the town of Madawaska, in Aroostook County, Maine, United States. Saint David has a post office with ZIP code 04773.

References

Villages in Aroostook County, Maine
Villages in Maine